Lasiopetalum venustum is a species of flowering plant in the family Malvaceae and is endemic to a restricted area in the south-west of Western Australia. It is an erect shrub with hairy stems, egg-shaped, three-lobed leaves and pink and dark red flowers.

Description
The leaves are covered with white and rust-coloured, star-shaped hairs, densely so on the lower surface.

Taxonomy
Lasiopetalum venustum was first formally described in 2015 by Kelly Anne Shepherd and Carolyn F. Wilkins in the journal Nuytsia from specimens collected in Boonanarring Nature Reserve in 2002. The specific epithet (venustum) means "attractive, charming or pretty".

Distribution and habitat
This lasiopetalum is only known from a nature reserve near Gingin, where it grows in woodland among granite boulders.

Conservation status
Lasiopetalum venustum is listed as "Priority Three" by the Government of Western Australia Department of Biodiversity, Conservation and Attractions, meaning that it is poorly known and known from only a few locations but is not under imminent threat.

References

venustum
Malvales of Australia
Flora of Western Australia
Plants described in 2015